BeLonG To is an LGBT youth organisation in Ireland which caters for young people aged between 14–23 years. It is a registered charity and is supported by the Irish Department of Education. The service was set up in March 2003.

The group received funding from the European Refugee Fund in June 2011 to provide support to young refugees who seek asylum in Ireland due to persecution because of their sexual orientation. In January 2012, the group was praised by the Head of Office of the UN High Commission for Refugees in Ireland for its work with LGBT refugees and was described as a "global model for best practice".

History
BeLonG To has its origins in an earlier Dublin-based youth group called OutYouth, which was run by youth volunteers in conjunction with the Gay Switchboard Dublin. Due to the voluntary nature of the group its operation was sometimes sporadic. In the final years of OutYouth, the group met with other LGBT organisations in Dublin and the City of Dublin Youth Services Board to seek funding for a new youth service project. The project secured funding from the Irish Department of Education and BeLonG To was formed in March 2003.

Groups
Dublin
BeLonG To Sunday for 14– to 17-year-olds.
IndividualiTy for 14 to 23-year-olds who are trans or questioning.
Over 18's for 18– to 23-year-olds.
Ladybirds for 14– to 23-year-old women who are lesbian, bisexual, trans or non-binary.

See also

LGBT rights in the Republic of Ireland

References

External links
BeLonG To — official website

LGBT organisations in the Republic of Ireland
LGBT youth organisations based in the Republic of Ireland